Éric Jalton (born 16 September 1961) is a French politician from Guadeloupe who is the current mayor of Les Abymes. He previously was a member of the National Assembly of France, from 2002 to 2017 where he represented the island of Guadeloupe,  and was a member of the Socialiste, radical, citoyen et divers gauche.

References 
 page on the French National Assembly website

1961 births
Guadeloupean politicians
Guadeloupean socialists
French people of Guadeloupean descent
Living people
Black French politicians
Deputies of the 12th National Assembly of the French Fifth Republic
Deputies of the 13th National Assembly of the French Fifth Republic
Deputies of the 14th National Assembly of the French Fifth Republic